The 44th Thailand National Games (also known as the 2015 National Games and the Nakhon Sawan Games) were held in Nakhon Sawan, Thailand from 12 to 21 December 2015.  The opening ceremony, scheduled for 11 December, was postponed by Bike for Dad ปั่นเพื่อพ่อ, to 12 December. There were matches in 43 sports and 77 disciplines.  The games were held in Nakhon Sawan Sport Center and Nakhon Sawan sport school. Nakhon Sawan also hosted the 28th national games in 1995.

Marketing

Emblem
The red curve is for powerful success, the blue curve for the strength of the sport, the red circle is for knowledge of the sport, and the golden circle frame is a victory medal of competition. The emblem also has the face of a Yingge dancer.

Mascot
The mascot is a dragon named Xiao Long (Dragon, 小龙), xiaolong meaning dragon. The Chinese dragon has been long regarded as the creator of humanitarian law, building confidence, showing power and goodness, mettle, heroic effort and perseverance, morality, nobility, and mightiness like a god. The Chinese dragon does not give up until they accomplish what they want; other attributes are conscientious, absolute discretion, optimistic, ambitious, beautiful, friendly and intelligent.

Torch relay

At the grand palace, General Surayud Chulanont gave the royal flame to Assistant Minister of Tourism and Sports and Nakhon Sawan and the National games and National Para Games Organizing Committee. The route of torch relay was around Nakhon Sawan Province.

Provinces participating

Sports

Official sports

Air sports
Archery
Athletics
Badminton
Basketball
Billiards and snooker
Bodybuilding
Bowling
Boxing
Canoeing
Sprint
Slalom
Cycling
BMX 
Mountain biking 
Road 
Track 
Dancesport
Extreme sports
BMX
Inline skate
Skateboard
Slalom
Fencing
Field hockey
Football
Futsal
Gymnastics
Artistic 
Rhythmic 
Trampoline 
Go
Golf
Handball
Judo
Kabaddi
Karate
Muay Thai
Netball
Petanque
Pencak silat
Rowing
Rugby football
Sepak takraw
Beach sepak takraw
Sepak takraw (Circle)
Sepak takraw
Shooting
Softball
Soft tennis
Swimming
Table tennis
Taekwondo
Poomsae
Kyorugi
Tennis
Thai fencing
Traditional boat
Tug of war
Volleyball
Beach volleyball
Volleyball
Weightlifting
Woodball
Wrestling
Freestyle
Greco-Roman

Demonstration sports
Makruk

Venues

 Note:Chai Nat Province is the venue for Cycling (BMX)

Ceremony

Opening ceremony

The opening ceremony started at 18:00 local time on December 12, 2015, at the Nakhon Sawan Province Central Stadium. It was attended by Minister of Tourism and Sports, Kobkarn Wattanavrangkul. This ceremony presented 4 shows including:
 The first show: River of Life; Nakhon Sawan has four rivers: Ping River, Wang River, Yom River and Nan River and stream converge into Chao Phraya River at Pak Nam Pho.
 The second show: Lod Lai Mangkorn (Dragon), Culture of Thai Chinese in Nakhon Sawan.
 The third show: Honor the King, Loyalty of Thai people to the King.
 The fourth show: Celebrating 100 years of Nakhon Sawan.

Closing ceremony

The closing ceremony started at 18:00 local time on December 12, 2015, at the Nakhon Sawan Province Central Stadium. It was attended by Assistant Minister of Tourism and Sports, Chawani Thongroj. This ceremony presented 4 shows and handover of the Thai National Games flag to the Governor of the Sports Authority of Thailand, Sakol Wannapong.

Medal tally

Suphanburi led the medal table for the third consecutive time. A total of 77 provinces won at least one medal, 67 provinces won at least one gold medal, 8 provinces won at least one silver medal and 2 provinces won at least one bronze medal.

References

External links
 

National Games
Thailand National Games
National Games
Thailand National Games
National Games